Acción Española (Spanish Action) or AE was a Spanish cultural association active during the Second Spanish Republic, meeting point of the ultraconservative and far right intellectual figures that endorsed the restoration of the Monarchy. It was also a political magazine of the same name. The group was heavily influenced by Action Française both in its name and its ideology. Constituted in October 1931, the cultural association was inaugurated on 5 February 1932, following the founding of the journal on 15 December 1931.

Formation
AE began life in December 1931 as a journal organised by doctrinaire monarchists. It was edited by Ramiro de Maeztu. Drawing in followers of the former Prime Minister Antonio Maura and the ultraconservative wings of Social Catholicism and Carlism, the group that developed around this journal promised to revive a strong Catholic monarchy. AE soon adopted an antisemitic discourse in imitation of similar movements in Europe. It soon built up contacts abroad, notably with Action Française, the Integralismo Lusitano and National Syndicalist movements in Portugal, and individual members of the National Fascist Party of Italy. The group's close links with Portuguese groups were driven by a strong belief in Hispanidad and a desire to see a return to the values of La Raza, which they felt had been abandoned in Spain. They also established a front political party, Renovación Española, in March 1933.

Development

The group committed itself to a new Catholic monarchy based on the principle of instauración or installation, where the new monarchy would be strongly authoritarian and corporatist in nature. It has been argued that the ideas of AE, rather than the Falange, had the strongest influence on Francisco Franco, as his eventual state featured a corporatist Cortes, a reliance on the military and the continuation of existing elites as promoted by the AE.

AE attracted some leading figures in Spanish society, with members of the group including the poet José María Pemán, the militarist Jorge Vigón Suero-Díaz and the film-maker Ernesto Giménez Caballero.

Members of AE set up a 'conspiratorial committee' in late 1932, meeting at the regularly at the Biarritz home of Juan Antonio Ansaldo to plan a restoration coup. A substantial amount of money was spent stockpiling arms, whilst Lieutenant-Colonel Valentín Galarza Morante was given responsibility for building up subversive cells in the army. However, despite continuous plotting, no coup was ever launched by the group.  The organization's co-founder, the famed political theorist Ramiro de Maeztu was summarily executed by a Republican death squad in the early days of the Spanish Civil War.

The cultural association was shut down since 6 August 1932 until 3 May 1934.

In Francoist Spain
Because the AE was not a political party, it was not absorbed into the Falange Española Tradicionalista y de las Juntas de Ofensiva Nacional-Sindicalista, although it was closely associated with that movement and AE members held leading positions within the group. A conflict broke out in April 1938 when leading AE member Eugenio Vegas Latapie was deprived of his seat on the FET y de las JONS National Council, leading to less co-operation between the AE and the Francoist State. Vegas Latapie and Ansaldo were involved in plotting against Franco around 1940 and 1941, although the AE as a group was not involved.

References

 
1931 establishments in Spain
Magazines established in 1931
Defunct political magazines published in Spain
Monarchist organizations
Organisations of the Spanish Civil War
Alfonsists
Antisemitic publications
Monarchism in Spain
Spanish-language magazines
Magazines with year of disestablishment missing